The Cyclopaedia of Political Science, Political Economy, and the Political History of the United States by the Best American and European Writers was an encyclopedia edited by John Joseph Lalor, first published in New York City in 1881 by Maynard, Merrill and Co. Its contents are in the public domain.

External links
Volume 1 of the 1890 edition at the Internet Archive
Volume 2 of the 1890 edition at the Internet Archive
Volume 3 of the 1890 edition at the Internet Archive

1881 non-fiction books
Reference works in the public domain
American online encyclopedias
Politics of the United States